Shamshir-e Darreh Rashid (also Romanized as Shamshīr-e Dārreh Rashīd; also known as Shamshīr-e Bālā) is a village in Howmeh-ye Sarpol Rural District, in the Central District of Sarpol-e Zahab County, Kermanshah Province, Iran. At the 2006 census, its population was 209, in 43 families.

References 

Populated places in Sarpol-e Zahab County